Senatorial elections have been held on 24 September 2017 to renew 170 of 348 seats in the Senate of the French Fifth Republic.

Organization

Senators concerned 
Since 2011, the French Senate has been renewed, using two series, every three years. The senatorial elections on 24 September 2017 concern 170 outgoing senators within series 1 across 44 constituencies in addition to half the seats of senators representing French residents overseas. Specifically, the renewal includes seats representing 38 metropolitan departments numbered between 37 (Indre-et-Loire) and 66 (Pyrénées-Orientales), the departments of Île-de-France, four overseas departments (Guadeloupe, Martinique, Réunion, and Mayotte), two overseas collectivities (Saint Pierre and Miquelon and New Caledonia), and 6 of 12 sieges of senators representing French residents overseas. Of these seats, 136 are elected proportionally and 34 by majority. The vacant series 2 seat in Savoie will be filled separately with a by-election also held on 24 September.

Electoral system 
Two methods are used to elect senators. The two-round majority vote is used in constituencies which elect 1 or 2 senators, affecting 18 constituencies and 34 seats in the 2017 elections. The candidate and their alternate must be of a different sex. In order to be elected in the first round, a candidate must secure an absolute majority of votes and a number of votes equal to at least a quarter of electors. If not, a second round is organized, in which case a relative majority will be enough for a candidate to be elected. In case of a tie, the oldest of the candidates is elected. Proportional representation is used in constituencies electing 3 or more senators; in the case of the 2017 elections, this affects 26 constituencies and 130 seats, in addition to the 6 seats for senators representing French residents overseas. Each list must be composed alternately of candidates of each sex.

Senators are elected through indirect universal suffrage by an electoral college composed of deputies, senators, regional councillors elected within a department, councillors of the Corsican Assembly designated under conditions set out within the electoral code, councillors of the Guianese Assembly, councillors of the Martinican Assembly, and departmental councillors. Delegates of municipal councils, however, make up the large majority of the electoral college, representing 95% of the 162,000 electors. The number of delegates of the municipal councils depends on the municipal population authenticated on 1 January 2014 by the census. Delegates must be French nationals and be registered on the electoral list of the municipality in question.

Candidates 
The minimum age for candidates in the senatorial elections is 24 years. After the 2014 renewal, the average age of senators was 61 years. Since the law on the accumulation of mandates of 14 February 2014, parliamentary mandates have been considered incompatible with local executive functions (president or vice-president of regional or departmental councils, mayor or deputies to mayors, and similar offices). This rule applies to all senators elected, re-elected, or in office as of 2 October 2017.

Results

Composition before renewal

Composition after renewal

Election of president 
Gérard Larcher was re-elected president of the Senate on 2 October 2017, challenged only by Didier Guillaume and Éliane Assassi.

See also 

2017 French presidential election
2017 French legislative election

References

External links 
Official website for the 2017 senatorial elections 
Composition by political group before renewal 
List of series 1 senators by constituency 

2017 elections in France
2017
September 2017 events in France